David Patrick Kelly (born 29 March 1979 in Dunedin, Otago) is a New Zealand cricketer who played for the Central Districts Stags in the 2000-01 when they won the Shell Cup. His highest first-class is the 212 not out when he carrying the bat for the Central Districts Stags against the Canterbury Wizards at Horton Park, Blenheim in the 2000-01.

References

1979 births
Living people
New Zealand cricketers
Central Districts cricketers
Northern Districts cricketers